is a Japanese company specializing in the planning, development and distribution of video games and the research, development and distribution of software, data and video media. The company was originally founded in 1996 as a computer graphics producer.

On January 16, 2002, the company launched a game development division and re-established itself as primarily a video game company. On September 30, 2003, Access Games became a wholly owned subsidiary of Digital Media Lab, in turn a subsidiary of Kaga Electronics. The head office is located in Chūō, Tokyo, but the company's development departments are located in Chūō-ku, Osaka.

Much of the company's employees had been members of Whoopee Camp and its transitional group Deep Space who joined following the release of Extermination. Access Games primarily specializes in action-adventure games and combat flight simulators. Hidetaka "SWERY" Suehiro notably worked for the company as the writer and director of Spy Fiction and Deadly Premonition.

Games

External links

References

Companies based in Osaka Prefecture
Video game companies established in 1996
Video game companies of Japan
Video game development companies
Japanese companies established in 1996